Diamer-Bhasha Dam is a concreted-filled gravity dam, in the preliminary stages of construction, on the River Indus between Kohistan district in Khyber Pakhtunkhwa and Diamer district in Gilgit Baltistan, Pakistan administered Kashmir. Its foundation stone was laid by the then Prime Minister of Pakistan in 1998. The dam site is situated near a place called "Bhasha", hence the name which is 40 km downstream of Chilas town and 315 km from Tarbela Dam. The eight million acre feet (MAF) reservoir with 272-metre height will be the tallest roller compact concrete (RCC) dam in the world.

Upon completion, Diamer-Bhasha dam would (i) produce 4800 megawatts of electricity through hydro-power generation; (ii) store an extra  of water for Pakistan that would be used for irrigation and drinking; (iii) extend the life of Tarbela Dam located downstream by 35 years; and (iv) control flood damage by the River Indus downstream during high floods.

However, in response to using Basha Dam to sideline the Kalabagh Dam, Engineer Anwer Khurshid has stated that "Bhasha dam is no substitute for Kalabagh dam not because of its altitude which is high enough, but because no irrigation canals can be taken out from it because of the hilly terrain. No canals can be taken out from any dam on the Indus except from Kalabagh Dam." 

It is planned to have a height of 272 meters spillway with fourteen gates each 11.5 m × 16.24 m. Two underground powerhouses are being proposed, one on each side of the main dam having six turbines on each side with a total installed capacity of 4500 MW.

On 13 May 2020, the Pakistani government signed a Rs.442 billion contract with a joint venture of China Power and Frontier Works Organisation (FWO) for the construction of the dam. The eight million acre feet (MAF) reservoir with 272-metre height will be the tallest roller compact concrete (RCC) dam in the world.

Long-term challenges facing the project since its inception in 1998 including securing funding from international lenders, groups such as the World Bank, Asian Development Bank and IMF were unwilling to lend because the dam was in territory disputed by Pakistan and India. However, the government of Imran Khan addressed these financial challenges in 2021 by issuing Pakistan's first-ever green bond, the bond received an emphatic response from investors as it was oversubscribed with 4 times greater number of investors willing to invest than required, raising $500 million of capital for this project.

Background
In January 2006, the Government of Pakistan under President Pervez Musharraf announced the decision to construct 5 multi-purpose storage dams in the country during next 10–12 years. According to the plan, the Diamer-Bhasha Dam project was proposed to be built in the first phase. In November 2008, the executive committee of National Economic Council formally approved the project. Council of Common Interests Pakistan, a constitutional body representing the provinces, also approved the construction of the dam. The Prime Minister of Pakistan laid the foundation stone of the project on 18 October 2011.

Timelines
In 1980, construction of the dam was suggested.
In 1998, prime minister of Pakistan, Nawaz Shareef, inaugurated the dam project.
In 2004, the first feasibility report was prepared.
In 2008, a revised feasibility report was prepared
In 2020, Contract was awarded for the construction

The construction work will take approximate 9 years.

Construction and financial matters
However, it will have a power generation capacity of 4500 megawatts.

An amount of Rs 27, billion is required for the acquisition of land and resettlement of the people to be affected in the wake of the construction of the dam. Under the proposed project, Rs 10.76 billion will be spent for the acquisition of agriculture-barren land, tree and nurseries and Rs 1.638 billion to be utilized for properties and infrastructure, Rs 8.8 billion for establishment of nine model villages, Rs 62,119 million for pay and allowances for administrative arrangements, and Rs 17.7 million for contingent administrative expenses. The project also includes an escalation cost of Rs 2.234 billion at the rate of 6 per cent per year for five years and interest of Rs 4.309 billion during the implementation at the rate of 9 per cent.

Detailed drawings of the dam were completed by March 2008. As of August 2012, the project faced several setbacks due to major sponsors backing out from financing the project, as World Bank and Asian Development Bank both refused to finance the project as according to them its location is in disputed territory and asked Pakistan to get a NOC from neighboring India.

On 20 August 2013- Finance Minister of Pakistan, Ishaq Dar claimed to have convinced the World Bank and the Aga Khan Development Network to finance the Diamer-Bhasha Project without the requirement of NOC from India. He also said that the Asian Development Bank, Aga Khan Rural Support Programme and Aga Khan Foundation had agreed to become lead finance manager for the project.

On 27 August 2013- Pakistan's Finance Minister, Ishaq Dar said that work would start on both Dasu and Diamer-Bhasha Dams simultaneously. He also said that Diamer-Bhasha project would take 10–12 years to complete.

On 7 November 2013- the Chairman of Water and Power Development Authority Syed Raghib Abbas Shah claimed that his department has received 17,000 acres of land at the cost of PKR 5.5 billion from Government of Gilgit-Baltistan and the Ismaili Community for the construction of the project.

Former Prime Minister Nawaz Sharif on December 5, 2016, approved, in principle, the financing plan for the Diamer-Bhasha dam and ordered the secretary of water and power to start physical work on the dam before the end of 2017.

On 14 November 2017- Pakistan dropped its bid  to have the dam financed under the China-Pakistan Economic Corridor framework as China placed strict conditions including on the ownership of the project. China had projected the cost of the dam to be $14 billion and to secure its investment China wanted Pakistan to pledge another operational dam to it.

On July 4, 2018- the Supreme Court of Pakistan directed the government to begin construction on the dam, as well as the Mohmand Dam, to resolve a water shortage. Chief Justice Saqib Nisar of the court gave a donation of 1 million Pakistani rupees for the construction of the two dams. And set up a fund for the construction of the dam. On July 6, the government of Pakistan set up a fund for the construction of the Diamer Bhasha Dam. Fundraising through bank accounts and cellular companies was initiated for participation.

On 9 September 2018- a Water and Power Development Authority official revealed that at least 12 billion dollars are required to build Diamer-Bhasha Dam. 5 billion dollars are required to build infrastructure while another 7 billion dollars are required for the power generation.

On 1 November 2018- PM-CJP fund for Diamer-Bhasha and Mohmand Dams which was opened in beginning of 3rd Quarter of 2018 i.e. in January 2019 its funds have reached US$66.7 million (i.e. PKR 9.29 billion) approximately. The status is regularly updated on the Supreme Court of Pakistan.

On 2 April 2020- it was revealed by WAPDA that Rs115.9  billion had been distributed for land acquisition of the project till February 2020.

On 13 May 2020, the Pakistani government signed a Rs.442 billion contract with a joint venture of China Power and Frontier Works Organisation (FWO) for the construction of the dam.

Design
The project is located on Indus River, about 315 km upstream of Tarbela Dam, 165 km downstream of the Northern Area capital Gilgit and 40 km downstream of Chilas.

 Main Dam:
Maximum Height: 272 meters
 Type: roller compacted concrete (RCC)
 Diversion System:
Tunnels: 2
 Canals: 1
 Cofferdam: Upstream and Downstream
 Main Spillway:
Gates: 9
 Size: 16.5×15.0 m
 Reservoir Level: 1160 m
 Min Operation Level Elevation: 1060 m
 Gross Capacity: 
 Live Capacity: 
 Outlets:
 Intermediate Level:8
 Low Level: 4
 Powerhouses:
No. of Powerhouses: 2
 Total Installed Capacity: 4500 MW
 Location of Powerhouses: one each on right and left side
 No. of Generator Units: 8
 Capacity/Unit: 560 MW
 Average Power Generation; 16,500 GWh
 Estimated Cost: US $14 Billion (2013 Estimate)

Purpose and function
The main purpose of the dam is water storage, irrigation and generation of electricity.
 Store huge water for next Pakistani generation.
Number of Trees arounds dam will be increase, so Global Climate Change will be Decrease.
 Production of 4500 megawatts of electricity by harnessing the water.
 Storage of an extra  of water for Pakistan that would be used for irrigation and drinking.
 Extend the life of Tarbela Dam located downstream by 35 years.
 Control flood damage by the River Indus downstream during high floods.
 Availability of about  annual surface face water storage for supplementing irrigation supplies during low flow periods.
 Harnessing of renewable source of clean and cheap energy through installed capacity of 4500 MW
 Reduction of dependence on environmentally damaging thermal power.
 Short and long term employment opportunities, particularly to locals, during the construction (15,000 jobs) and operation phase
 Creation of massive infrastructure leading to overall socio-economic uplift of the area and standard of living of people.

Environmental impact and resettlement
Environmental Impact:
 Villages affected: 31
 Houses affected: 4100 
 Population affected: 35,000
 Agricultural land submerged:  
 Area under reservoir: 
Resettlement:
 Proposed new settlements: 9 model villages. 
 Population resettled: 28,000 
 New infrastructure, roads, clean water supply schemes, schools, health centres, electricity supply, etc. 
 Development of new tourism industry in area around reservoir (including hotels, restaurants, water sports, etc.).
 Development of hitherto non-existent fresh-water fishing industry based on newly created reservoir.

Heritage issues 
The dam will submerge heritage including rock carvings/petroglyphs dating as far back as 6th millennium BC. Locals say that these are not only of great historical significance for Buddhists but also for promoting tourism and need to relocate to safe side.

See also 

 List of dams and reservoirs in Pakistan
 Indus Waters Treaty
 Katzarah Dam

References

External links
 WAPDA Info Sheet
 Diamer Basha Dam Online Donations

Economy of Gilgit-Baltistan
Hydroelectric power stations in Pakistan
Dams on the Indus River
Roller-compacted concrete dams
Proposed hydroelectric power stations
Proposed renewable energy power stations in Pakistan